Perkawinan is a 1972 Indonesian drama film directed by Wim Umboh. The film won nine awards at the Indonesian Film Festival in 1973.

Awards

References 

Indonesian-language films
1972 films
Indonesian drama films